Runiform may refer to scripts or inscriptions similar written with letters that are similar in form to the runic scripts that were historically used to write various Germanic languages in Northern Europe. It may refer to:

Coelbren y Beirdd
Old Turkic alphabet
Old Hungarian alphabet
Siglas poveiras
hypothetical Pre-Christian Slavic writing

See also
 Rune (disambiguation)
 Reniform (disambiguation)